Brides-les-Bains is a commune in the Savoie department in the Auvergne-Rhône-Alpes region in south-eastern France.

It was an Olympic Village for the 1992 Winter Olympics, based in Albertville, France.

Brides-les-Bains' main attraction to tourists is its convenience for Méribel. The village has a few attractions, including several health spas and a casino, and sites of historic or cultural interest, including the springs from which the town takes its name, a medieval church and a statue made out of piping titled "La Manche de Chapeau" (French: "The Sleeve of a Hat").

See also
Communes of the Savoie department

References

Communes of Savoie